Shengli Subdistrict is a subdistrict on the center of Shunyi District, Beijing, China. It shares border with Shuangfeng Subdistrict to the north, Guangming Subdistrict to the east, Shiyuan Subdistrict to the south, and Wanquan Subdistrict to the west. It had 46,494 inhabitants under its administration as of 2020.

History

Administrative divisions 

In 2021, Shengli Subdistrict was composed of 20 residential communities:

Gallery

See also 

 List of township-level divisions of Beijing

References 

Shunyi District
Subdistricts of Beijing